The Cupola is a mountain in the south-west region of Tasmania, Australia. The Redtop Peak is situated to the west of The Cupola.

The mountain's name may derive from cupola, a dome-shaped ornamental structure located on top of a larger roof or dome.

See also

List of mountains in Tasmania
 Strathgordon, Tasmania

References

Cupola, The
Cupola, The